Semuc Champey is a natural monument in the department of Alta Verapaz, Guatemala, near the Q'eqchi' Maya town of Lanquín. It consists of a natural 300 m limestone bridge, under which passes the Cahabón River. Atop the bridge is a series of stepped, turquoise pools, a popular swimming attraction. 

The name Semuc Champey is from the Qʼeqchiʼ language, meaning where the river hides under the earth. 

The best and most popular way to see Semuc Champey is from the "El Mirador" viewpoint. Though it is a roughly 45-minute hot, uphill jungle hike from the parking area, the views into the valley are unparalleled.

Although it can be difficult to get to, Semuc is becoming more and more popular with travelers.

References

External links

Taking a Tour to Semuc Champey
Semuc Champey Photos, Videos, and Overview

Protected areas of Guatemala